Mantophasmatidae  is a family of carnivorous wingless insects within the order Notoptera, which was discovered in Africa in 2001. Originally, the group was regarded as an order in its own right, and named Mantophasmatodea, but, using recent evidence indicating a sister group relationship with Grylloblattidae (formerly classified in the order Grylloblattodea), Arillo and Engel have combined the two groups into a single order, Notoptera.

Overview
The most common vernacular name for this order is gladiators, although they also are called rock crawlers, heelwalkers, mantophasmids, and colloquially, mantos. Their modern centre of endemism is western South Africa and Namibia (Brandberg Massif), although the modern relict population of Tanzaniophasma subsolana in Tanzania and Eocene fossils suggest a wider ancient distribution.

Mantophasmatodea are wingless even as adults, making them relatively difficult to identify. They resemble a cross between praying mantises and phasmids, and molecular evidence indicates that they are most closely related to the equally enigmatic group Grylloblattodea. Initially, the gladiators were described from old museum specimens that originally were found in Namibia (Mantophasma zephyra) and Tanzania (M. subsolana), and from a 45-million-year-old specimen of Baltic amber (Raptophasma kerneggeri).

Live specimens were found in Namibia by an international expedition in early 2002; Tyrannophasma gladiator was found on the Brandberg Massif, and Mantophasma zephyra was found on the Erongoberg Massif.

Since then, a number of new genera and species have been discovered, the most recent being two new genera, Kuboesphasma and Minutophasma, each with a single species, described from Richtersveld in South Africa in 2018.

Biology 
Mantophasmatids are wingless carnivores. During courtship, they communicate using vibrations transmitted through the ground or substrate.

Classification
The most recent classification recognizes numerous genera, including fossils:

 Basal and incertae sedis
 Genus †Raptophasma Zompro, 2001 Baltic amber, Eocene
 Genus †Adicophasma Engel & Grimaldi, 2004 Baltic amber, Eocene
Genus †Juramantophasma Huang et al, 2008 Daohugou Bed, China, Middle Jurassic (Callovian)
 Genus ?†Ensiferophasma Zompro, 2005 (assignment to Mantophasmatodea considered dubious)
 Subfamily Tanzaniophasmatinae
 Genus Tanzaniophasma Klass, Picker, Damgaard, van Noort, Tojo, 2003 – Tanzania
 Species Tanzaniophasma subsolana (Zompro, Klass, Kristensen, & Adis 2002)
 Subfamily Mantophasmatinae
 Tribe Tyrannophasmatini
 Genus Praedatophasma Zompro & Adis, 2002 – Namibia
 Species Praedatophasma maraisi Zompro & Adis, 2002
 Genus Tyrannophasma Zompro, 2003 – Namibia
 Species Tyrannophasma gladiator Zompro, 2003
 Tribe Mantophasmatini Zompro, Klass, Kristensen, Adis, 2002 (paraphyletic?)
 Genus Mantophasma Zompro, Klass, Kristensen, Adis, 2002 – Namibia
 Species Mantophasma gamsbergense Zompro & Adis, 2006
 Species Mantophasma kudubergense Zompro & Adis, 2006
 Species Mantophasma omatakoense Zompro & Adis, 2006
 Species Mantophasma zephyra Zompro, Klass, Kristensen, & Adis 2002
 Genus Pachyphasma  Wipfler, Pohl, & Predel, 2012 – Namibia
 Species Pachyphasma brandbergense  Wipfler, Pohl, & Predel, 2012
 Genus Sclerophasma Klass, Picker, Damgaard, van Noort, Tojo, 2003 – Namibia
 Species Sclerophasma paresisense Klass, Picker, Damgaard, van Noort, & Tojo 2003
 Tribe Austrophasmatini Klass, Picker, Damgaard, van Noort, Tojo, 2003
 Genus Austrophasma Klass, Picker, Damgaard, van Noort, Tojo, 2003 – South Africa
 Species Austrophasma caledonense Klass, Picker, Damgaard, van Noort & Tojo, 2003
 Species Austrophasma gansbaaiense Klass, Picker, Damgaard, van Noort & Tojo, 2003
 Species Austrophasma rawsonvillense Klass, Picker, Damgaard, van Noort & Tojo, 2003
 Genus Hemilobophasma Klass, Picker, Damgaard, van Noort, Tojo, 2003 – South Africa
 Species Hemilobophasma montaguense Klass, Picker, Damgaard, van Noort & Tojo, 2003
 Genus Karoophasma Klass, Picker, Damgaard, van Noort, Tojo, 2003 – South Africa
 Species Karoophasma biedouwense Klass, Picker, Damgaard, van Noort & Tojo, 2003
 Species Karoophasma botterkloofense Klass, Picker, Damgaard, van Noort & Tojo, 2003
 Genus Kuboesphasma Wipfler, Theska & Predel, 2018 – South Africa
 Species Kuboesphasma compactum Wipfler, Theska & Predel, 2018
 Genus Lobatophasma Klass, Picker, Damgaard, van Noort, Tojo, 2003 (formerly Lobophasma) – South Africa
 Species Lobatophasma redelinghuysense Klass, Picker, Damgaard, van Noort & Tojo, 2003
 Genus Minutophasma Wipfler, Theska & Predel, 2018 – South Africa
 Species Minutophasma richtersveldense Wipfler, Theska & Predel, 2018
 Genus Namaquaphasma Klass, Picker, Damgaard, van Noort, Tojo, 2003 – South Africa
 Species Namaquaphasma ookiepense Klass, Picker, Damgaard, van Noort, Tojo, 2003
 Genus Striatophasma Wipfler, Pohl & Predel, 2012 – Namibia
 Species Striatophasma naukluftense Wipfler, Pohl & Predel, 2012
 Genus Viridiphasma Eberhard, Picker, Klass, 2011 – South Africa
 Species Viridiphasma clanwilliamense Eberhard, Picker, Klass, 2011

Some taxonomists assign full family status to the subfamilies and tribes, and sub-ordinal status to the family. In total, there are 21 extant species described as of 2018.

See also
Oliver Zompro

References

External links 

 Mantophasmatodea - A new order of insects
 New insect order found in Southern Africa
 New order of insects identified: Mantophasmatodea find their place in Class Insecta
 Man discovers a new life-form at a South African truck stop

 
Insect families
Insects of Namibia
Insects of South Africa